Tenerife is an island of the province of Santa Cruz de Tenerife, Canary Islands, Spain.

Tenerife may also refer to:

Places

Spain
Province of Santa Cruz de Tenerife a province of the autonomous community of Canary Islands
Santa Cruz de Tenerife, the capital of the Canary Islands
Tenerife Airport (disambiguation)
Pico de Tenerife, a mountain on the island of El Hierro

Elsewhere
Teneriffe, Queensland, an inner city suburb in Brisbane, Australia
Mount Teneriffe, a granite formation in Victoria in Australia
Pico Teneriffe (Barbados), mountains in northeast Barbados
Pic a Tenerife, a mountain in Gros Morne National Park, Canada
Cerro Tenerife (Chile), a mountain in the Chilean Patagonia
Tenerife, Magdalena, a town and municipality in Colombia
San Carlos de Tenerife, a city in the Dominican Republic
Mount Teneriffe (Washington), a mountain in Washington State, US
Cerro Tenerife (Venezuela), a mountain
Quebrada Tenerife, a hill in Venezuela
Montes Teneriffe, a mountain range on the moon

Other
Tenerife CB, a Spanish basketball team based in Santa Cruz de Tenerife, Canary Islands, Spain
1399 Teneriffa, an asteroid
CD Tenerife, a Spanish football club based in Santa Cruz de Tenerife, in the Canary Islands, Spain
CV Tenerife, a Spanish volleyball club in Tenerife, Canary Islands, Spain

See also
 Teneriffe (disambiguation)